Alexander Sarnavskiy (born January 17, 1989) is a Russian mixed martial artist who competes in the lightweight division. A professional MMA competitor since 2008, Sarnavskiy has mostly competed in his native Russia, where he is an M-1 Global veteran and former lightweight division in the Bellator Fighting Championships.

Mixed martial arts career

Background
Sarnavskiy trains at RusFighters Sport Club, which is also home to Bellator season three middleweight champion Alexander Shlemenko. Like Shlemenko, Sarnavskiy shows a tendency to prefer the striking aspect of fighting, though he is regarded as skilled on the ground too, as evidenced by his opening two victories coming via triangle choke.

M-1 Global
After compiling a record of 8–0 (3 submission, 4 KO/TKOs), Sarnavskiy joined M-1 Global to enter their selection tournament. His opening round fight was against Maxim Kuptsov. Midway through the first round, Sarnavskiy caught his opponent in a body triangle and peppered him with punches from behind. He soon went for a rear naked choke, which forced the tapout from Kuptsov.

Sarnavskiy then faced Karen Grigoryan in the next round, defeating him by split decision, advancing him to the final.

Following the win over Grigoryan, Sherdog ranked him as the number one undefeated European prospect in the sport. Around the same time, Sarnavskiy was scheduled to face Artiom Damkovsky at the M-1 Eastern European Finals. The bout was cancelled however and Damkovsky faced a replacement opponent in the final.

Appearing at M-1 Challenge XXI: Guram vs. Garner, Sarnavskiy faced Victor Kuku. Immediately, Sarnavskiy went after Kuku and went for a flying knee. Sarnavskiy's spinning back fist knocked Kuku down, before he hit Kuku with a barrage of punches to claim the knockout win.

Sarnavskiy made his U.S. MMA debut in Norfolk, Virginia on March 25, 2011, on the televised portion of M-1 Challenge: Damkovsky vs. Figueroa. He faced late replacement Beau Baker and won the fight via submission in the second round.

Bellator MMA
On June 19, 2012, Sarnavskiy signed with Bellator, thus terminating the contract with M-1 Global.

Sarnavskiy entered as a participant in the Bellator season seven lightweight tournament. In the opening round, he faced Rich Clementi on October 19, 2012, at Bellator 77. He lost the fight via split decision (29–28, 28–29, 30–26).

Sarnavskiy defeated Tony Hervey on November 30, 2012, at Bellator 82 via unanimous decision (30–27, 30–27, 30–27).

In 2013, Sarnavskiy entered as a participant in the Bellator Season 8 Lightweight tournament. He faced Brazilian Kickboxer Thiago Michel in the quarter finals on January 31, 2013, at Bellator 87 and won via submission in the second round.

Sarnavskiy was originally scheduled to face David Rickels in the semifinals. However, Sarnavskiy fractured his hand during his first fight and had to withdraw from the tournament.

In the fall of 2013, Sarnavskiy entered the next Lightweight tournament. He faced Marcus Davis on September 27, 2013, at Bellator 101 in the Quarterfinals of Bellator's Season Nine Lightweight Tournament. After knocking Davis down with a punch, he took his back and eventually won via a rear naked choke submission.

Sarnavskiy faced Ricardo Tirloni in the semifinals and won via triangle choke in the first round.

Sarnavskiy faced Will Brooks in the finals and lost via unanimous decision.

After nearly a year away from the Bellator cage, Sarnavskiy was expected to face John Gunderson on October 10, 2014, at Bellator 128. However, Gunderson withdrew from the bout and retired from MMA fighting. Derek Campos stepped in as a replacement. An injury forced Campos out of the fight, Sarnavskiy eventually faced promotional newcomer Dakota Cochrane. He won the fight by submission in the first round.

Sarnavskiy faced Marcin Held on April 10, 2015, at Bellator 136.
He lost the fight via verbal submission in the third round and was subsequently released from the promotion.

Post-Bellator MMA
Sarnavskiy faced Jesse Ronson on October 3, 2015, at Abu Dhabi Warriors 3. He won via unanimous decision.

Eurasia Fight Nights Global (EFN)
Sarnavskiy faced Murad Machaev on February 26, 2016, at Fight Nights: Battle of Moscow 21. He lost the fight via unanimous decision.

Sarnavskiy faced Dmitry Bikrev on April 29, 2016, at Fight Nights Global 46. He won the fight via submission in the second round.

Absolute Championship Berkut
Sarnavskiy faced Ustarmagomed Gadzhidaudov on September 17, 2016, at ACB 45: Silva vs. Magomedsharipov. He lost the fight by knockout in the second round.

Sarnavskiy faced Ramazan Esenbaev on December 18, 2016, at ACB 50: Rasulov vs. Goltsov. He won thefight via TKO in the third round.

Sarnavskiy faced Eduard Vartanyan on April 15, 2017, at ACB 57: Payback. He lost the fight via submission in the second round.

Sarnavskiy faced Shamil Nikaev at ACB 80 on February 16, 2018. He lost the bout via split decision.

Bouncing back from the loss, Sarnavskiy knocked out Herdeson Batista on November 10, 2018 at ACB 90.

Sarnavskiy faced Aurel Pirtea on December 14, 2019 at ACA 103. He won the bout, knocking out Aurel in the third round.

In the title fight at ACA 111 on September 29, 2020 for the ACA Lightweight Championship, he lost to the champion Abdul-Aziz Abdulvakhabov by unanimous decision, breaking his arm during the bout.

In his first bout post recovery and title bout loss, Sarnavskiy faced Artem Damkovskiy at ACA 118 on February 26, 2021. He won the bout via rear-naked choke at the end of the first round.

Sarnavskiy faced Rashid Magomedov on September 24, 2021 at ACA 129: Sarnavskiy vs. Magomedov. He won the close bout via split decision.

Sarnavskiy faced Herdeson Batista on May 21, 2022 at ACA 139. He won the bout via TKO stoppage under a minute into the bout.

Championships and accomplishments
M-1 Global
М-1 Selection Eastern Europe Championship 2010.
Bellator Fighting Championships
Bellator Season 9 Lightweight Tournament Runner Up

Mixed martial arts record

|-
|Win
|align=center|40–8
|Herdeson Batista
|TKO (punches)
|ACA 139: Vartanyan vs. Ilunga
|
|align=center|1
|align=center|0:42
|Moscow, Russia
|
|-
| Win
| align=center| 39–8
| Rashid Magomedov
| Decision (split)
| ACA 129: Sarnavskiy vs. Magomedov
| 
|align=center|5
|align=center|5:00
| Moscow, Russia
| 
|-
| Win
| align=center| 38–8
| Artem Damkovskiy
| Submission (rear-naked choke)
| ACA 118: Abdulaev vs. Vagaev 2
| 
| align=center| 1
| align=center| 4:55
| Moscow, Russia
| 
|-
| Loss
| align=center| 37–8
| Abdul-Aziz Abdulvakhabov
| Decision (unanimous)
| ACA 111: Sarnavsky vs. Abdulvakhabov
| 
| align=center| 5
| align=center| 5:00
| Moscow, Russia
| 
|-
| Win
| align=center| 37–7
| Aurel Pirtea
| KO (punch)
| |ACA 103: Yagshimuradov vs. Butorin
| 
| align=center| 3
| align=center| 0:39
| St. Petersburg, Russia
|
|-
| Win
| align=center| 36–7
| Herdeson Batista
| KO (knee)
| |ACB 90: Vakhaev vs. Bilostenniy
| 
| align=center| 1
| align=center| 2:11
| Moscow, Russia
|
|-
| Loss
| align=center| 35–7
| Shamil Nikaev
| Decision (split)
| |ACB 80: Tumenov vs. Burrell
| 
| align=center| 3
| align=center| 5:00
| Krasnodar, Russia
|
|-
| Loss
| align=center| 35–6
| Eduard Vartanyan
| Submission (rear-naked choke)
| ACB 57: Payback
| 
| align=center| 2
| align=center| 4:47
| Moscow, Russia
|
|-
| Win
| align=center| 35–5
| Ramazan Esenbaev
| TKO (corner stoppage)
| |ACB 50: Stormbringer
| 
| align=center| 3
| align=center| 3:49
| Saint Petersburg, Russia
|
|-
| Loss
| align=center| 34–5
| Ustarmagomed Gadzhidaudov
| KO (punch)
| |ACB 45: Magomedsharipov vs. Silva
| 
| align=center| 2
| align=center| 4:19
| Saint Petersburg, Russia
|
|-
| Win
| align=center| 34–4
| Jorge Patino
| Decision (unanimous)
| Abu Dhabi Warriors 4
| 
| align=center| 3
| align=center| 5:00
| Abu Dhabi, United Arab Emirates
| 
|-
| Win
| align=center| 33–4
| Dmitry Bikrev
| Submission (rear-naked choke)
| Fight Nights Global 46: Mokhnatkin vs. Kudin
| 
| align=center| 2
| align=center| 2:35
| Moscow, Russia
|
|-
| Loss
| align=center| 32–4
| Murad Machaev
| Decision (unanimous)
| Fight Nights Global 44: Machaev vs. Sarnavskiy
| 
| align=center| 3
| align=center| 5:00
| Moscow, Russia
|
|-
| Win
| align=center| 32–3
| Leandro Rodrigues Pontes
| KO (punch)
| FEFoMP: International Tournament in Pankration
| 
| align=center| 1
| align=center| 1:58
| Vladivostok, Russia
| 
|-
| Win
| align=center| 31–3
| Jesse Ronson
| Decision (unanimous)
| Abu Dhabi Warriors 3
| 
| align=center| 3
| align=center| 5:00
| Abu Dhabi, United Arab Emirates
| 
|-
| Loss
| align=center| 30–3
| Marcin Held
| Submission (kneebar)
| Bellator 136
| 
| align=center| 3
| align=center| 1:11
| Irvine, California, United States
| 
|-
| Win
| align=center| 30–2
| Artak Nazaryan
| KO (flying knee)
| FEFoMP: Cup of Friendship
| 
| align=center| 1
| align=center| 4:09
| Novosibirsk, Russia
| 
|-
| Win
| align=center| 29–2
| Dakota Cochrane
| Submission (rear-naked choke)
| Bellator 128
| 
| align=center| 1
| align=center| 2:32
| Thackerville, Oklahoma, United States
| 
|-
| Win
| align=center| 28–2
| Drew Brokenshire
| Submission (rear-naked choke)
| Plotforma S-70: 5
| 
| align=center| 2
| align=center| 4:08
| Sochi, Russia
| 
|-
| Win
| align=center| 27–2
| Yukinari Tamura
| Submission (rear-naked choke)
| Ural Fight League: Resurrection
| 
| align=center| 3
| align=center| 4:54
| Ekaterinburg, Sverdlovsk, Russia
| 
|-
| Win
| align=center| 26–2
| Alexander Butenko
| Decision (unanimous)
| Union of Veterans of Sport: Cup of Champions
| 
| align=center| 3
| align=center| 5:00
| Novosibirsk, Russia
| 
|-
| Loss
| align=center| 25–2
| Will Brooks
| Decision (unanimous)
| Bellator 109
| 
| align=center| 3
| align=center| 5:00
| Bethlehem, Pennsylvania, United States
| 
|-
| Win
| align=center| 25–1
| Ricardo Tirloni
| Submission (triangle choke)
| Bellator 105
| 
| align=center| 1
| align=center| 1:08
| Rio Rancho, New Mexico, United States
| 
|-
| Win
| align=center| 24–1
| Marcus Davis
| Submission (rear-naked choke)
| Bellator 101
| 
| align=center| 1
| align=center| 1:40
| Portland, Oregon, United States
| 
|-
| Win
| align=center| 23–1
| Atchin Chaoshen Ne
| Submission (armbar)
| FEFoMP: Mayor Cup 2013
| 
| align=center| 1
| align=center| 1:35
| Khabarovsk, Russia
| 
|-
| Win
| align=center| 22–1
| Thiago Michel
| Submission (rear-naked choke)
| Bellator 87
| 
| align=center| 2
| align=center| 3:43
| Mount Pleasant, Michigan, United States
| 
|-
| Win
| align=center| 21–1
| Tony Hervey
| Decision (unanimous)
| Bellator 82
| 
| align=center| 3
| align=center| 5:00
| Mount Pleasant, Michigan, United States
| 
|-
| Loss
| align=center| 20–1
| Rich Clementi
| Decision (split)
| Bellator 77
| 
| align=center| 3
| align=center| 5:00
| Reading, Pennsylvania, United States
| 
|-
| Win
| align=center| 20–0
| Maykel Becerra
| KO (knee)
| FEFoMP: Mayor Cup 2012
| 
| align=center| 1
| align=center| 1:24
| Khabarovsk, Russia
| 
|-
| Win
| align=center| 19–0
| Len Bentley
| Submission (triangle choke)
| Saturn: Martial Arts Festival
| 
| align=center| 1
| align=center| 1:50
| Omsk, Russia
| 
|-
| Win
| align=center| 18–0
| Sergio Cortez
| Submission (rear-naked choke)
| M-1 Challenge 30: Zavurov vs. Enomoto
| 
| align=center| 1
| align=center| 1:46
| Costa Mesa, California, United States
| 
|-
| Win
| align=center| 17–0
| Thomas Deak
| Decision (unanimous)
| Union of Veterans of Sport: Russia vs. Europe
| 
| align=center| 2
| align=center| 5:00
| Novosibirsk, Russia
| 
|-
| Win
| align=center| 16–0
| Marcio Cesar
| Submission (rear-naked choke)
| League S-70: Russia vs. Brazil
| 
| align=center| 1
| align=center| 1:04
| Sochi, Russia
| 
|-
| Win
| align=center| 15–0
| Doug Evans
| Submission (triangle choke)
| FEFoMP: Mayor's Cup 2011
| 
| align=center| 1
| align=center| 2:40
| Khabarovsk, Russia
| 
|-
| Win
| align=center| 14–0
| Beau Baker
| Submission (rear-naked choke)
| M-1 Challenge 24: Damkovsky vs. Figueroa
| 
| align=center| 2
| align=center| 2:32
| Norfolk, Virginia, United States
| 
|-
| Win
| align=center| 13–0
| Arsen Ubaidulaev
| Submission (rear-naked choke)
| M-1 Challenge 22: Narkun vs. Vasilevsky
| 
| align=center| 1
| align=center| 0:43
| Moscow, Russia
| 
|-
| Win
| align=center| 12–0
| Victor Kuku
| KO (spinning back fist and punches)
| M-1 Challenge 21: Guram vs. Garner
| 
| align=center| 1
| align=center| 0:13
| Saint Petersburg, Russia
| 
|-
| Win
| align=center| 11–0
| Aleksey Ershik
| Submission (rear-naked choke)
| FEFoMP: Open Championship of Vladivostok
| 
| align=center| 1
| align=center| 0:30
| Vladivostok, Russia
| 
|-
| Win
| align=center| 10–0
| Karen Grigoryan
| Decision (split)
| M-1 Selection 2010: Eastern Europe Round 3
| 
| align=center| 3
| align=center| 5:00
| Kyiv, Ukraine
| 
|-
| Win
| align=center| 9–0
| Maxim Kuptsov
| Submission (rear-naked choke)
| M-1 Selection 2010: Eastern Europe Round 1
| 
| align=center| 1
| align=center| 4:03
| Saint Petersburg, Russia
| 
|-
| Win
| align=center| 8–0
| Mamour Fall
| Submission (triangle choke)
| Saturn & RusFighters: Battle of Gladiators
| 
| align=center| 2
| align=center| 1:50
| Omsk, Russia
| 
|-
| Win
| align=center| 7–0
| Timur Daurenuly
| KO (punches)
| Saturn & RusFighters: Battle of Gladiators
| 
| align=center| 1
| align=center| 0:35
| Omsk, Russia
| 
|-
| Win
| align=center| 6–0
| Maratbek Kalabekov
| Decision (split)
| ProFC: Union Nation Cup 4
| 
| align=center| 3
| align=center| 3:00
| Rostov-on-Don, Russia
| 
|-
| Win
| align=center| 5–0
| Vladimir Simonyan
| KO (punches)
| ProFC: Union Nation Cup 3
| 
| align=center| 1
| align=center| 0:17
| Rostov-on-Don, Russia
| 
|-
| Win
| align=center| 4–0
| Kardash Fatakhov
| TKO (punches)
| Siberian League: Tomsk Challenge
| 
| align=center| 1
| align=center| 8:40
| Tomsk, Russia
| 
|-
| Win
| align=center| 3–0
| Islam Mamedov
| KO (punches)
| Siberian League: Tomsk Challenge
| 
| align=center| 1
| align=center| 5:34
| Tomsk, Russia
| 
|-
| Win
| align=center| 2–0
| Andrei Koshkin
| Submission (triangle choke)
| Siberian League: New Hopes
| 
| align=center| 1
| align=center| 2:15
| Novokuznetsk, Russia
| 
|-
| Win
| align=center| 1–0
| Rishat Gilmitdinov
| Submission (triangle choke)
| Universal Fighter
| 
| align=center| 1
| align=center| 2:00
| Ufa, Russia
|

See also
List of male mixed martial artists
List of current Bellator fighters

References

External links

1989 births
Lightweight mixed martial artists
Mixed martial artists utilizing ARB
Mixed martial artists utilizing Muay Thai
Mixed martial artists utilizing Brazilian jiu-jitsu
Living people
Russian male mixed martial artists
Russian Muay Thai practitioners
Russian practitioners of Brazilian jiu-jitsu
Sportspeople from Omsk